The Southern Jaguars baseball team is a varsity intercollegiate athletic team of Southern University in Baton Rouge, Louisiana, United States. The team is a member of the Southwestern Athletic Conference, which is part of the National Collegiate Athletic Association's Division I. The team plays its home games at Lee–Hines Field in Baton Rouge, Louisiana.

Background
The Jaguars have more SWAC titles than any school. They also have more national and black national titles than any SWAC school. Though Southern was forced to discontinue its baseball program during the uncertain times of the Great Depression and World War II years (specifically from 1932 to 1947), its program was largely stable in the subsequent post-war decades; only four head coaches coached Southern between 1949 and 2017.

In 1959 Southern, led by future National Baseball Hall of Famer Lou Brock, became the first historically black college or university (HBCU) to win the National Association of Intercollegiate Athletics national championship. In 1987 Southern became the first HBCU to win a game in an NCAA Division I regional tournament by defeating #2-ranked Cal State Fullerton. In 1996 Southern became the first HBCU to win a game in an NCAA Division I play-in series by defeating Austin Peay. In 2003 and 2005, Southern won blackcollegebaseball.com black national championships; in 2019 Southern won a third black national championship, this time designated by blackcollegenines.com, for its Large School Division.

Head coaches
Robert Henry ("Bob") Lee, a graduate of LeMoyne College, served as head coach between 1949 and 1962, before moving on to become coach of the football team. He compiled a 207–51 (.802) overall record as baseball coach. In addition to coaching Brock and the 1959 team to an NAIA national title, he also led the Jaguars to the 1960 NAIA World Series and 2 official and 4 unofficial SWAC titles (for the 1949, 1950, 1955, and 1956 seasons). The Jaguars' baseball stadium is named in part for him.

Emory Wellington Hines, a Texas College alum who had coached the football teams of Grambling State—before the famed Eddie Robinson had assumed the reigns—as well as Samuel Huston College, served as Southern's baseball coach between 1963 and 1976. He led the Jaguars to 2 NAIA Area 5 titles—World Series appearances, 4 NAIA District titles, 9 NAIA District tournaments, 1 NCAA Division II tournament, and 8 SWAC titles. He finished his career at Southern with a 373–130–1 (.741) record. His most noteworthy player may have been Danny Goodwin, the only player to have ever been drafted first overall in two Major League Baseball drafts and the first documented Southern player to win a national college baseball player of the year award (from the Sporting News, in 1975). The Jaguars' baseball stadium was later named in part for Hines.

When Southern's athletic director had to step away from his service due to surgery, Hines was promoted in his place, and Hines recommended that Southern alum and assistant coach Lee Flentroy replace him as acting coach.

Southern alum Leroy Boyd later served as acting coach once the 1977 season began and was then promoted to permanent coach after the season—a title that he held through 1984. He led the Jaguars to 6 SWAC West titles, 2 SWAC titles, 3 NAIA District tournaments, and a 255–157–4 record, for a .618 winning percentage. His most prominent player may have been Reggie Williams.

The Jaguars were most recently led by head coach and Southern alumnus Roger Cador. He completed his coaching career, which spanned from 1985 to 2017, with a 913 wins, 597 losses, and 3 ties (.604), 22 SWAC West titles, 14 SWAC titles, 8 NCAA Division I tournament appearances, 3 NCAA Division I tournament play-in appearances, and 2 blackcollegebaseball.com HBCU national titles. He also holds the distinction of having coached the first HBCU player to win a Baseball America College Player of the Year Award, Collegiate Baseball Player of the Year award, Dick Howser Trophy, Golden Spikes Award, or Rotary Smith Award (Rickie Weeks Jr., in 2003). Cador struggled with health concerns during his later seasons and, due to issues with his pacemaker, the final three weeks of the 2010 season had to be coached by acting head coach Fernando Puebla—although the results of those games are officially credited to Cador (Puebla himself later had issues acquiring full U.S. citizenship and had to step down from the coaching staff shortly before the start of the 2014 season, resulting in Cador assuming additional coaching duties as the season approached). Cador later suffered from a bout of pneumonia late in the 2017 season, and assistant coach Dan Canevari filled in for him as acting head coach while Cador recovered.

Due to poor record-keeping by athletic department personnel between 2010 and 2015, 218 student athletes from 15 sports teams at Southern were linked to rules infractions by the NCAA; it is not immediately clear how many, if any, of Cador's 137 wins from that time period may have been vacated by the NCAA. However, with various unresolved Academic Progress Rate issues, the NCAA limited recruiting efforts, scholarship awards, practice time, and postseason participation for the incoming head coach.

On July 26, 2017 Southern announced the hiring of Kerrick Jackson as coach. He attended St. Louis Community College–Meramec and then Bethune–Cookman, but later transferred to Nebraska. He led Southern to a 9–33 (.214) record in his first season at the helm. His second team went 32–24 (.571), won the SWAC Western Division, the SWAC, the blackcollegenines.com Large School Division HBCU national championship, and qualified for the BCSG 360 HBCU World Series (which was later canceled due to inclement weather). Southern also made a return to the NCAA tournament. His third team was 6–10 when the NCAA canceled all spring sports competition due to the COVID-19 pandemic. Jackson resigned on November 30, 2020, and Chris Crenshaw was named the interim head coach.

Since 1949 (when Lee became coach) and through the 2019 season, the team's overall record is 1,795–1,002–8 (.641) on the field—before any wins from 2010 to 2015 that may have been vacated by the NCAA are factored in.

Notes: *—Flentroy served as acting head coach between the 1976 and 1977 seasons, and Boyd served as acting head coach during the 1977 season; **—up to 137 wins between 2010 and 2015 are subject to be vacated by the NCAA (it is not yet clear how many, if any, of these wins included ineligible players)

Teams

Notes: *—total includes game forfeited by Prairie View A&M, due to the use of an ineligible player; **—up to 137 wins between 2010 and 2015 are subject to be vacated by the NCAA (it is not yet clear how many, if any, of these wins included ineligible players); §—team ineligible for postseason play, due to a violation of NCAA rules concerning Academic Progress Rate scores; †—game canceled, due to inclement weather; ‡—season canceled by NCAA due to COVID-19 pandemic

Players
In 1985 Brock was inducted into the National Baseball Hall of Fame and Museum. In 2011 Goodwin became the first former HBCU player inducted into the National College Baseball Hall of Fame, and in 2012 Brock became the second.

Major League Baseball
Southern has had 96 Major League Baseball Draft selections since the draft began in 1965.

See also
List of NCAA Division I baseball programs

References

External links